The second season of StarStruck, is a Philippine television reality talent competition show, was broadcast on GMA Network. Hosted by Dingdong Dantes with the StarStruck Kids host, Jolina Magdangal, it premiered on October 11, 2004. The council was composed of Joey de Leon, Christopher de Leon and Louie Ignacio. There were slight changes made in the Council, Joyce Bernal was replaced by  Louie Ignacio. The season ended with 96 episodes on February 20, 2005, having Mike Tan and Ryza Cenon as the Ultimate Survivors.

The series is streaming online on YouTube.

Overview
The second season of StarStruck was announced once again on GMA Network's variety program, SOP, where the hosts invited teenagers from 14 to 18 years old to audition for the upcoming season. Like its first season, much of the auditions were held at the GMA Network's headquarters and at SM Supermalls throughout the Philippines.

The show primer aired the untold secrets of the first season's final fourteen the life they had before and after StarStruck, and the changes StarStruck made into their lives.

The pilot episode was aired on October 11, 2004. With a new set of survivors and more rigid tests. The same rules were applied in selecting the Ultimate Survivors. StarStruck is shown only weekdays having Mondays to Thursdays will be tests and Fridays would be the elimination night. The show held its the Final Judgment on February 20, 2005 at the Araneta Coliseum.

Selection process
In the second year of the reality-talent search, Out of thousands who auditioned nationwide, only the Top 100 was chosen for the first cut. From the Top 100, it was trimmed down to the Top 60, then from the Top 60 to the Top 30, and from the Top 30 to the final fourteen finalists.

The Final 14 underwent various workshops and training in order to develop their personalities, talents, and charisma. But, the twist is that every week, one or two hopefuls from the final fourteen may have to say goodbye until only four remain. Those who were eliminated were dubbed as StarStruck Avengers.

The Final 4 will vie for the coveted the Ultimate Survivors titles, the Ultimate Male Survivor and the Ultimate Female Survivor, both of them will received P1,000,000 pesos each plus and an exclusive management contract from GMA Network.

The Runners-up, both of them will received P250,000 each plus and an exclusive management contract from the network.  The StarStruck Avengers (the losing contestants) also received an exclusive contract from the network.

Hopefuls
When the Final 14 was chosen, they are assigned to different challenges every week that will hone their acting, singing, and dancing abilities. Every Friday, one is meant to leave the competition until there were just six others who are left. From survivor six, there will be two of them who will be eliminated and after the elimination of the two; the final four will be revealed.

The Final 4 will be battling with each other on the Final Judgment. People will choose who they want to win the competition by online voting and text voting. 30% of the result will come from the online and text votes and the remaining 70% is from the council.

Avengers Strike's Back Twist
This season was the first occurrence where a former eliminated contestant returned to the competition which was named The Avengers Strike's Back. The avengers competing with the remaining survivors are Jelaine Santos, Kevin Santos, Ailyn Luna, Ken Punzalan, Ana David, Chris Martin, Krizzy Jareño and CJ Muere.

Survivor Six Twist
CJ Muere was eliminated on December 24, 2004. But because of the Strike's Back, Benj Pacia was later replaced by him and returned to the contest through a major twist wherein an avengers will be given the chance to re-enter the contest by emerging with at least fourth-best in cumulative scores among the Survivor Six now consists of LJ Reyes, Megan Young, Ryza Cenon, Benj Pacia, Kirby de Jesus and Mike Tan.

CJ Muere emerged in the survivor six, and was reinstated while Benj Pacia was eliminated. Some viewers did not like this twist for it undermined the rules and regulations of the show. Although, the fans of CJ Muere and welcomed his return to the competition and proved to be worthy to be part of the elite final four. CJ Muere also got the highest Jollibee votes, thus he starred in a Jollibee Commercial.

Color key:

Weekly Artista Tests
Color key:

Week 1: The official Final 14 hopefuls have been chosen.

Eliminated Contestant: None

Week 2: The Final 14 hopefuls, are still complete.

Week 3: The Final 13 hopefuls.

Week 4: The Final 12 hopefuls.

Week 5: The Final 11 hopefuls.

Week 6: The Final 10 hopefuls.

Eliminated Contestant: None

Week 7: The Final 10 hopefuls.

Eliminated Contestant: None

Week 8: The Final 10 hopefuls, on Monday elimination night.

Week 8: The Final 9 hopefuls, on Friday elimination night.

Week 9: The Final 8 hopefuls

Week 10: The Final 7 hopefuls.

Pre-Recognation Awardee Contestant: Not Awarded

Week 11: The Survivor 6 hopefuls.

Pre-Recognation Awardee Contestant: None
Eliminated Contestant: None

Week 12: The First week of The Avengers Strike's Back Twist.

Pre-Recognation Awardee Contestant: None
Eliminated Contestant: None

Avengers Strike's Back Twist

Week 13: The Second week of The Avengers Strike's Back Twist.

Pre-Recognation Awardee Contestant: Not Awarded

Survivor 6 Hopefuls

Avengers Strike's Back Twist

Survivor 6 Twist

Week 14: The Survivor 6 hopefuls.

Pre-Recognation Awardee Contestant: Not Awarded

Week 15: The Survivor 6 hopefuls, The official Final 4 hopefuls have been chosen.

Pre-Recognation Awardee Contestant: Not Awarded

Week 16-17: The Final 4 Homecoming

Week 18: The Final Judgment, the Ultimate Survivors have been proclaimed.

Final Judgment
The winner was announced on a two-hour TV special dubbed as StarStruck: The Final Judgment was held live on February 20, 2005 at the Araneta Coliseum again, the venue was jam-packed of an estimated 12,000 inside and 3,000 outside fans.

The opening dance number, together with season's avengers, and they were joined by this final four and the graduates from the previous season. Hosted by Dingdong Dantes and Jolina Magdangal with the guest co-hosting on the event Raymond Gutierrez. The council was formed with Joey de Leon (dubbed as the Entertainment Guru), Christopher de Leon (multi-awarded actor), and Louie Ignacio (director) representing it.

The final four then performs their solo performances. The female survivors, LJ Reyes with Rainier Castillo from a dance number by a song of Aryanna’s Bop It performs a dance number with the Abstract dancers and Kids@Work, Ryza Cenon with Mark Herras a dance number by a song of Master P featuring Weebie Krazy’s  Rock It performs a dance number with the Abstract dancers and Kids@Work and together with the Manoeuvres. Next the male survivors, CJ Muere with Yasmien Kurdi a dance number by a song of ?’s ? performs a dance number with the Abstract dancers and Kids@Work and Mike Tan with Jennylyn Mercado a dance number by a song of ?’s ? performs a dance number with the Abstract dancers and Kids@Work.

The avengers’ performance came in next, in a song and dance medley detailing the journey of the survivors from the audition process, the four International contenders and the elimination of the tenth avengers for a sing and dance number.

Announcement come, Ryza Cenon of Gapan, Nueva Ecija with a score of 92.34% is the Ultimate Female Survivor and Mike Tan of Angono, Rizal with a score of 90.58%  is the Ultimate Male Survivor were proclaimed as the Ultimate Survivors, each of them received P1,000,000 pesos each plus and an exclusive management contract from GMA Network.

While, LJ Reyes of Quezon City with a score of 89.99% and CJ Muere of San Pablo, Laguna with a score of 88.96% were proclaimed as the Runners-up, each of them received P250,000 pesos each plus and an exclusive management contract from the network. The  StarStruck Avengers (the losing contestants) also received an exclusive contract from the network. The Final Judgment gained 37.2% in ratings.

Film Assignment
For their first Film Assignment, the final four Mike Tan, Ryza Cenon, CJ Muere and LJ Reyes with the avenger Kirby de Jesus for upcoming cast of the Philippine romantic comedy film, Lovestruck Dream. Believe. Fall In Love! directed by Louie Ignacio.
They co-starred with Jolina Magdangal and the StarStruck alumna Mark Herras, Jennylyn Mercado, Rainier Castillo and Yasmien Kurdi.

Signature dances
There are signature dances and songs made in each batch. 
With this batch, their signature dances and songs are:
Chocolatte
El Biro-Biro
Don't You Just Know It
Follow The Leader
Bop It
Rock It

Elimination chart
Color key:

Notes

 It was a non-elimination week. The bottom group are Ailyn Luna, Ken Punzalan and Kevin Santos was safe for the elimination on October 22, 2004.
 It was a non-elimination week. The bottom group are Ana David, CJ Muere and Krizzy Jareño was safe for the elimination on November 26, 2004.
 It was a non-elimination week. The bottom group are Ana David, Benj Pacia and Kirby de Jesus was safe for the elimination on December 3, 2004.
 It was a non-elimination week. The bottom group are Kirby de Jesus, Ryza Cenon and Mike Tan was safe for the elimination on December 31, 2004. 
 The avengers strikes back: Jelaine Santos, Kevin Santos, Ailyn Luna, Ken Punzalan, Ana David, Chris Martin, Krizzy Jareño. CJ Muere was eliminated on December 24, 2004. But because of the strike back, Benj Pacia was later replaced by him and returned to the contest through a major twist wherein an avenger (a losing contestant) will be given the chance to re-enter the contest by emerging with at least fourth-best in cumulative scores among the survivor six.
 CJ Muere emerged in the final four, and was reinstated while Benj Pacia was eliminated.
 It was a non-elimination week. The bottom group are the remaining survivor six, was safe for the elimination on January 21, 2005. 
 the final four was chosen on January 28, 2005. And the last avengers are Megan Young and Kirby de Jesus. The first called to eliminated is Megan Young and the second called is Kirby de Jesus.
 In the final judgment night, Mike Tan and Ryza Cenon were proclaimed as the Ultimate Survivors.

External links
 

StarStruck (Philippine TV series)
2004 Philippine television seasons
2005 Philippine television seasons